α-Ketoisocaproic acid (α-KIC) and its conjugate base, α-ketoisocaproate, are metabolic intermediates in the metabolic pathway for -leucine. Leucine is an essential amino acid, and its degradation is critical for many biological duties. α-KIC is produced in one of the first steps of the pathway by branched-chain amino acid aminotransferase by transferring the amine on L-leucine onto alpha ketoglutarate, and replacing that amine with a ketone. The degradation of L-leucine in the muscle to this compound allows for the production of the amino acids alanine and glutamate as well. In the liver, α-KIC can be converted to a vast number of compounds depending on the enzymes and cofactors present, including cholesterol, acetyl-CoA, isovaleryl-CoA, and other biological molecules. Isovaleryl-CoA is the main compound synthesized from ɑ-KIC. α-KIC is a key metabolite present in the urine of people with Maple syrup urine disease, along with other branched-chain amino acids. Derivatives of α-KIC have been studied in humans for their ability to improve physical performance during anaerobic exercise as a supplemental bridge between short-term and long-term exercise supplements. These studies show that α-KIC does not achieve this goal without other ergogenicsupplements present as well. α-KIC has also been observed to reduce skeletal muscle damage after eccentrically biased resistance exercises in people who do not usually perform those exercises.

Biological Activity

Supplements
α-KIC has been studied as a nutritional supplement to aid in the performance of strenuous physical activity. Studies have shown that taking ɑ-KIC and its derivatives before acute physical activity led to an increase in muscle work by 10%, as well as a decrease in muscle fatigue during the early phase of the physical activity. When taken with other supplements over a two-week period, such as beta-hydroxy beta-methylbutyrate (HMB), participants reported delayed onset of muscle soreness, as well as other positive effects such as increased muscle girth. It is important to note that studies have also suggested that ɑ-KIC taken alone did not have any significant positive impacts on physical performance, so it should be taken in conjunction with other ergogenic substances. ɑ-KIC is not available as a supplement on its own, but its aminated form HMB is available in calcium salt capsules or powder.

Applications
The biochemical implications of α-KIC are largely connected to other biochemical pathways. Protein Synthesis, skeletal muscle regeneration, and skeletal muscle proteolysis have all been noted to change when ɑ-KIC is taken. There is not much research into the specific mechanisms taking part in these processes, but there is a noticeable correlation between ɑ-KIC ingestion and increased skeletal muscle protein synthesis, regeneration, and proteolysis.

Toxicity
Multiple studies have demonstrated that there have been no adverse effects on humans nor animals that ingested α-KIC or HMB.

In patients with maple syrup urine disease, who are unable to metabolize the branched chain alpha keto acids,  α-KIC is believed to be one of the key mediators of neurotoxicity.

Medical Use
Branched-chain alpha-keto acids such as α-KIC are found in high concentrations in the urine of people who suffer from Maple Syrup Urine Disease. This is disease is caused by a partial branched-chain alpha-keto acid dehydrogenase deficiency, which leads to a buildup of branched-chain alpha-keto acids, including α-KIC and HMB. These keto-acids build up in the liver, and since limited isovaleryl-CoA can be produced, these keto-acids must be excreted in the urine as α-KIC, HMB, and many other similar keto acids. Flare-ups in people who have this condition are caused due to poor diet. Symptoms of Maple Syrup Urine Disease include sweet smelling urine, irritability, lethargy, and in serious cases edema of the brain, apnea, coma, or respiratory failure. Treatment includes lowering leucine intake and a specialized diet to make up for the lack of leucine ingestion.

Leucine metabolism

References 

Alpha-keto acids